Avalofractus abaculus is a frond-like rangeomorph fossil described from the Ediacaran of the Trepassey Formation, Spaniard's Bay, Newfoundland.

Morphology
Avalofractus displays a strongly fractal body shape, with four levels of nearly perfectly self-similar, pinnate, alternate branches. It was about 5 cm long on average, with a 1 cm-diameter holdfast at the base of the frond. The stem length is from 1/3 to 1/2 that of the whole frond. It is quite similar to Rangea, even if with distinct morphological differences that justify the creation of a new genus (e.g. absence of subsidiary quilts, frond elements free to rotate independently instead of being attached to each other by a membrane).

Distribution
In contrast with other rangeomorphs, which have wide distributions, Avalofractus seems to have been an endemic species, being known only from the Spaniard's Bay deposits.

Reproduction
It has been suggested that Avalofractus could have been capable of vegetative reproduction: loose fronds could have detached and grow, rather like a plant cutting. This could explain the mysterious lack of independent rangeomorph fronds smaller than 10 mm in the fossil record.

A previous suggestion that Avalofractus younger individuals were encased in a sheath-like structure has been later dismissed.

See also
 List of Ediacaran genera

References

Ediacaran life
Rangeomorpha
Ediacaran Canada
Fossil taxa described in 2009